Javier Castilla Conde (born April 18, 1981, in Bogotá) is a professional male squash player who represented Colombia. He reached a career-high world ranking of World No. 186 in March 2007 after having joined the Professional Squash Association (PSA) in 2006.

References

External links 
 

1981 births
Living people
Colombian male squash players
Sportspeople from Bogotá
Squash players at the 2007 Pan American Games
Squash players at the 2011 Pan American Games
Pan American Games gold medalists for Colombia
Pan American Games medalists in squash
South American Games gold medalists for Colombia
South American Games medalists in squash
Competitors at the 2010 South American Games
Medalists at the 2007 Pan American Games
21st-century Colombian people